Professional boxing, or prizefighting, is regulated, sanctioned boxing. Professional boxing bouts are fought for a purse that is divided between the boxers as determined by contract. Most professional bouts are supervised by a regulatory authority to guarantee the fighters' safety. Most high-profile bouts obtain the endorsement of a sanctioning body, which awards championship belts, establishes rules, and assigns its own judges and referees.

In contrast with amateur boxing, professional bouts are typically much longer and can last up to twelve rounds, though less significant fights can be as short as four rounds. Protective headgear is not permitted, and boxers are generally allowed to take substantial punishment before a fight is halted. Professional boxing has enjoyed a much higher profile than amateur boxing throughout the 20th century and beyond.

Professional boxing was banned in Cuba from 1962 to April 2022. This was also the case in Sweden between 1970 and 2007, and Norway between 1981 and 2014.

History

Early history 

In 1891, the National Sporting Club (N.S.C.), a private club in London, began to promote professional glove fights at its own premises, and created nine of its own rules to augment the Queensberry Rules. These rules specified more accurately, the role of the officials, and produced a system of scoring that enabled the referee to decide the result of a fight. The British Boxing Board of Control (BBBofC) was first formed in 1919 with close links to the N.S.C., and was re-formed in 1929 after the N.S.C. closed.

In 1909, the first of twenty-two belts were presented by the fifth Earl of Lonsdale to the winner of a British title fight held at the N.S.C. In 1929, the BBBofC continued to award Lonsdale Belts to any British boxer who won three title fights in the same weight division. The "title fight" has always been the focal point in professional boxing. In the 19th and early 20th centuries, however, there were title fights at each weight. Promoters who could stage profitable title fights became influential in the sport, as did boxers' managers. The best promoters and managers have been instrumental in bringing boxing to new audiences and provoking media and public interest. The most famous of all three-way partnership (fighter-manager-promoter) was that of Jack Dempsey (heavyweight champion 1919–1926), his manager Jack Kearns, and the promoter Tex Rickard. Together they grossed US$8.4 million in only five fights between 1921 and 1927 and ushered in a "golden age" of popularity for professional boxing in the 1920s. They were also responsible for the first live radio broadcast of a title fight (Dempsey v. Georges Carpentier, in 1921). In the United Kingdom, Jack Solomons' success as a fight promoter helped re-establish professional boxing after the Second World War and made the UK a popular place for title fights in the 1950s and 1960s.

Modern history

1900 to 1920

In the early twentieth century, most professional bouts took place in the United States and Britain, and champions were recognised by popular consensus as expressed in the newspapers of the day. Among the great champions of the era were the peerless heavyweight Jim Jeffries and Bob Fitzsimmons, who weighed less than 12 stone (164 pounds),  but won world titles at middleweight (1892), light heavyweight (1903), and heavyweight (1897). Other famous champions included light heavyweight Philadelphia Jack O'Brien and middleweight Tommy Ryan. After winning the Bantamweight title in 1892,  Canada's George Dixon became the first ever black athlete to win a World Championship in any sport; he was also the first Canadian-born boxing champion. On May 12, 1902 lightweight Joe Gans became the first black American to be boxing champion. Despite the public's enthusiasm, this was an era of far-reaching regulation of the sport, often with the stated goal of outright prohibition. In 1900, the State of New York enacted the Lewis Law, banned prizefights except for those held in private athletic clubs between members. Thus, when introducing the fighters, the announcer frequently added the phrase "Both members of this club", as George Wesley Bellows titled one of his paintings. The western region of the United States tended to be more tolerant of prizefights in this era, although the private club arrangement was standard practice here as well, San Francisco's California Athletic Club being a prominent example.

On December 26, 1908, heavyweight Jack Johnson became the first black heavyweight champion and a highly controversial figure in that racially charged era.  Prizefights often had unlimited rounds, and could easily become endurance tests, favouring patient tacticians like Johnson. At lighter weights, ten round fights were common, and lightweight Benny Leonard dominated his division from the late teens into the early twenties.

Championship level prizefighters in this period were the premier sports celebrities, and a title bout generated intense public interest. Long before bars became popular venues in which to watch sporting events on television, enterprising saloon keepers were known to set up ticker machines and announce the progress of an important bout, blow by blow. Local kids often hung about outside the saloon doors, hoping for news of the fight. Harpo Marx, then fifteen, recounted vicariously experiencing the 1904 Jeffries-Munroe championship fight in this way.

1920 to present

Length of bouts 
Professional bouts are limited to a maximum of twelve rounds, where each round last 3 minutes for men, 2 minutes for women. Most are fought over four to ten rounds depending upon the experience of the boxers.  Through the early twentieth century, it was common for fights to have unlimited rounds, ending only when one fighter quit or the fight was stopped by police.  In the 1910s and 1920s, a fifteen-round limit gradually became the norm, benefiting high-energy fighters like Jack Dempsey.

For decades, boxing matches went on for 15 rounds, but that was all changed on November 13, 1982 following the death of Korean boxer Duk Koo Kim in a fight against Ray Mancini. Studies following the fight have concluded that his brain had become more susceptible to damage after the 12th round.  Exactly three months after the fatal fight, the WBC reduced the number of their championship fights to 12 three-minute rounds with 1 minute in between, making the total bout 47 minutes long.

Scoring 
If the bout "goes the distance", meaning that the scheduled time has fully elapsed, the outcome is determined by decision.  In the early days of boxing, the referee decided the outcome by raising the winner's arm at the end of the bout, a practice that is still used for some professional bouts in the United Kingdom.  In the early twentieth century, it became the practice for the referee or judge to score bouts by the number of rounds won by each boxer.  To improve the reliability of scoring, two ringside judges were added besides the referee, and the winner was decided by majority decision.  Since the late twentieth century, it has become common practice for the judges to be three ringside observers who award a score to each boxer for each round, with the referee having the authority to deduct points for certain violations.  

At the conclusion of the bout, each of the three judges tallies the points awarded to each boxer.  A winner is declared if at least two judges score the bout in favour of the same boxer.  The result is either a (win by) “unanimous decision”, by “majority decision” (if the third judge scores a draw), or by “split decision” (if the third judge scores the bout in favour of the other boxer).  Otherwise, the result is a draw: a “unanimous draw” (if all three judges scored the bout a draw), a “majority draw” (if two judges scored the bout a draw, regardless of the result reached by the third judge), or a “split draw” (if each boxer was the winner on one scorecard, and the third judge scored a draw).

10-point system

The 10-point system was first introduced in 1968 by the World Boxing Council (WBC) as a rational way of scoring fights.  It was viewed as such because it allowed judges to reward knockdowns and distinguish between close rounds, as well as rounds where one fighter clearly dominated their opponent.  Furthermore, the subsequent adoption of this system, both nationally and internationally, allowed for greater judging consistency, which was something that was sorely needed at the time.  There are many factors that inform the judge's decision but the most important of these are: clean punching, effective aggressiveness, ring generalship and defense. Judges use these metrics as a means of discerning which fighter has a clear advantage over the other, regardless of how minute the advantage.

Development 
Modern boxing rules were initially derived from the Marquess of Queensberry rules which mainly outlined core aspects of the sport, such as the establishment of rounds and their duration, as well as the determination of proper attire in the ring such as gloves and wraps.  These rules did not, however, provide unified guidelines for scoring fights and instead left this in the hands of individual sanctioning organizations.  This meant that fights would be scored differently depending on the rules established by the governing body overseeing the fight.  It is from this environment that the 10-point system evolved.   The adoption of this system, both nationally and internationally, established the foundation for greater judging consistency in professional boxing.

Usage 
In the event the winner of a bout cannot be determined by a knockout, technical knockout, or disqualification, the final decision rests in the hands of three ringside judges approved by the commission. The three judges are usually seated along the edge of the boxing ring, separated from each other. The judges are forbidden from sharing their scores with each other or consulting with one another. At the end of each round, judges must hand in their scores to the referee who then hands them to the clerk who records and totals the final scores. Judges are to award 10 points (less any point deductions) to the victor of the round and a lesser score (less any point deductions) to the loser. The losing contestant's score can vary depending on different factors.

The "10-point must" system is the most widely used scoring system since the mid-20th century. It is so named because a judge "must" award 10 points to at least one fighter each round (before deductions for fouls).  Most rounds are scored 10–9, with 10 points for the fighter who won the round, and 9 points for the fighter the judge believes lost the round.  If a round is judged to be even, it is scored 10–10. For each knockdown in a round, the judge deducts an additional point from the fighter knocked down, resulting in a 10–8 score if there is one knockdown or a 10–7 score if there are two knockdowns.  If the referee instructs the judges to deduct a point for a foul, this deduction is applied after the preliminary computation. So, if a fighter wins a round, but is penalised for a foul, the score changes from 10–9 to 9–9.  If that same fighter scored a knockdown in the round, the score would change from 10–8 in his favour to 9–8. While uncommon, if a fighter completely dominates a round but does not score a knockdown, a judge can still score that round 10–8. Judges do not have the ability to disregard an official knockdown.  If the referee declares a fighter going down to be a knockdown, the judges must score it as such.

If a fight is stopped due to an injury that the referee has ruled to be the result of an unintentional foul, the fight goes to the scorecards only if a specified number of rounds (usually three, sometimes four) have been completed. Whoever is ahead on the scorecards wins by a technical decision. If the required number of rounds has not been completed, the fight is declared a technical draw or a no contest.

If a fight is stopped due to a cut resulting from a legal punch, the other participant is awarded a technical knockout win. For this reason, fighters often employ cutmen, whose job is to treat cuts between rounds so that the boxer is able to continue despite the cut.

Variants
Other scoring systems have also been used in various locations, including the five-point must system (in which the winning fighter is awarded five points, the loser four or fewer), the one-point system (in which the winning fighter is awarded one or more points, and the losing fighter is awarded zero), and the rounds system which simply awards the round to the winning fighter. In the rounds system, the bout is won by the fighter determined to have won more rounds. This system often used a supplemental points system (generally the 10-point must) in the case of even rounds.

Championships 

In the first part of the 20th century, the United States became the centre for professional boxing. It was generally accepted that the "world champions" were those listed by the Police Gazette. After 1920, the National Boxing Association (NBA) began to sanction "title fights". Also during that time, The Ring was founded, and it listed champions and awarded championship belts. The NBA was renamed in 1962 and became the World Boxing Association (WBA). The following year, a rival body, the World Boxing Council (WBC) was formed. In 1983, the International Boxing Federation (IBF) was formed. In 1988, another world sanctioning body, the World Boxing Organization (WBO) was formed. In the 2010s a boxer had to be recognised by these four bodies to be the undisputed world champion; minor bodies like the International Boxing Organization (IBO) and World Boxing Union (WBU) are disregarded. Regional sanctioning bodies such as the North American Boxing Federation (NABF), the North American Boxing Council (NABC) and the United States Boxing Association (USBA) also awarded championships. The Ring magazine also continued listing the world champion of each weight division, and its rankings continue to be appreciated by fans.

Major sanctioning bodies 

 International Boxing Federation (IBF)
 World Boxing Association (WBA)
 World Boxing Council (WBC)
 World Boxing Organization (WBO)

Citations
 Combat sports: Professional boxing championship rules; Government of Ontario. (2016, June 28). Retrieved November 11, 2018
 Did Lennox Lewis Beat Evander Holyfield?: Methods for Analysing Small Sample Interrater Agreement Problems; Herbert K. H. Lee, Cork, D., & Algranati, D. (2002). Journal of the Royal Statistical Society. Series D (The Statistician), 51(2), pp. 129–146.
 Rules for IBF, USBA & Intercontinental Championship and Elimination Bouts;  IBF, O. (2015, June). Retrieved November 7, 2018
 WORLD BOXING FEDERATION RULES & REGULATIONS OF CHAMPIONSHIP CONTESTS ; WBF. (2009). Retrieved November 6, 2016.
 ABC Unified Rules of Boxing; WBO, E., & ABC. (2008, July 3).  Retrieved November 6, 2018.

References

External links
 Boxing Record Archive 
 TOP Boxing websites 
 

Professional
Articles containing video clips
Combat sports
Boxing